"Harleys in Hawaii" is a song by American singer Katy Perry. It was released as a standalone single on October 16, 2019, by Capitol Records, along with its music video. It was later included on Perry's sixth studio album, Smile (2020). The song was written by Jacob Kasher Hindlin, Perry and its producers Charlie Puth and Johan Carlsson.

Development and release
The song's cover art, revealed in October 2019, was called "retro" on Fox News. She said the inspiration for the song was a trip to Hawaii with fiancé Orlando Bloom.

Perry shot a music video for the song in Hawaii in July 2019. The video was produced by Catalan video producer Canada and directed by Pau Lopez, Gerardo del Hierro, and Tomas Pena under the name Manson and was released on October 16, 2019.

Composition

"Harleys in Hawaii" is a tropical, pop,  trap, reggae and R&B song, which describes Perry's emotions as she rides Harley-Davidson motorcycles in Hawaii with her lover. It is played in the key of B minor and follows a chord progression of Bm-Em-Fm. The song is three minutes and five seconds long.

Critical reception
Dani Blum from Pitchfork believed that Perry remains "[a] master at executing proven chart-topping formulas". He praised Perry's vocals and deemed the track "[a] standard, breezy pop: a gently writhing beat". Mike Wass of Idolator wrote that Perry "switches it up with a soft and sexy bop" after "delivering a double dose of emotional pure-pop" with her previous singles "Never Really Over" and "Small Talk". He also stated that the song is "a mid-tempo earworm" and a "refreshingly grown pop song" despite its "kitsch title". Louise Bruton from The Irish Times described the song as "hazy and oddly brilliant". "Harleys in Hawaii" was deemed as a highlight on Smile by Stephen Thomas Erlewine of AllMusic. John Dolan of Rolling Stone described "Harleys In Hawaii" as "[a] cute island R&B escapade".

Chart performance
"Harleys in Hawaii" debuted at number one in the New Zealand Hot Singles chart, 67 in Scotland and 71 in Canada. The song did not chart on the Billboard Hot 100, but landed at number ten on the Bubbling Under Hot 100.

In the United Kingdom, the song debuted at No. 45 on the Official Singles Chart in October 2019. It saw resurgence in sales and streams in September 2021, where its chart sales rose 426% month-on-month. A part of this can be attributed to the song going viral on TikTok. The track was streamed 215,000 times in the UK, a large increase from the 25,000 average weekly streams it was getting earlier in the year prior to going viral.

Impact
Mark Gardiner from The New York Times noted the song's marketing value for the Harley-Davidson company. He said that "Harleys in Hawaii" has been viewed extensively by a demographic that "the motorcycle maker has had a hard time reaching." According to Business Insider, the publicity is estimated to be worth over $40 million for Harley-Davidson. In 2021, the song became a popular TikTok trend.

Accolades

Track listing
Digital download and streaming
"Harleys in Hawaii" — 3:06

Digital download and streaming (Win and Woo Remix)
"Harleys in Hawaii" (Win and Woo Remix) — 3:26

Digital download and streaming (KANDY Remix)
"Harleys in Hawaii" (KANDY Remix) — 2:45

Credits and personnel
Credits adapted from Tidal.

Katy Perry – vocals, songwriter
Charlie Puth – producer, songwriter, backing vocals, drum programming, synthesizer
Johan Carlsson – songwriter, producer, backing vocals, drum programming, synthesizer, guitar, rhodes
Jacob Kasher Hindlin – songwriter
Peter Karlsson – vocal editor, vocal producer
Jeremy Lertola – engineer, assistant recording engineer
Cory Bice – engineer
Rachael Findlen – engineer
Sam Holland – engineer
Serban Ghenea – mixing
John Hanes – mix engineer
Dave Kutch – mastering engineer

Charts

Certifications

Release history

References

2019 singles
2019 songs
Katy Perry songs
Capitol Records singles
Harley-Davidson
Songs about bicycles
Songs written by Charlie Puth
Songs written by Johan Carlsson (musician)
Songs written by Katy Perry
Songs written by Jacob Kasher
Tropical songs
Trap music songs
American reggae songs